Majra Khurd is a village in Mahendragarh district in Haryana state in northern India.

Villages in Mahendragarh district